Armour Donald Ashe (14 October 1925 – 15 June 1968) was a Scottish professional footballer who played as a full back, making over 250 league appearances in both Scotland and England.

Career
Born in Paisley, Ashe began his career with Dalry Thistle, before turning professional with Aberdeen in 1949. He also played for St Mirren, Stockport County, Accrington Stanley, Gateshead and Southport, and later played non-league football with Horwich RMI.

References

External links

1925 births
1968 deaths
Footballers from Paisley, Renfrewshire
Scottish footballers
Dalry Thistle F.C. players
Aberdeen F.C. players
St Mirren F.C. players
Stockport County F.C. players
Accrington Stanley F.C. (1891) players
Gateshead F.C. players
Southport F.C. players
Leigh Genesis F.C. players
Scottish Football League players
English Football League players
Association football fullbacks